Olivier Dall'Oglio (born 16 May 1964) is a French former professional footballer and current manager who played as a defender. He was most recently head coach of Ligue 1 side Montpellier.

Early life
Dall'Oglio was born in Alès, Gard.

Managerial career
On 1 June 2012, Dall'Oglio was named manager of Dijon. He later moved to Brest, before joining Montpellier in June 2021.

Managerial statistics

References

External links

1964 births
Living people
People from Alès
Sportspeople from Gard
French footballers
Association football defenders
Olympique Alès players
RC Strasbourg Alsace players
Canet Roussillon FC players
Stade Rennais F.C. players
Ligue 1 players
Ligue 2 players
French football managers
Olympique Alès managers
Dijon FCO managers
Stade Brestois 29 managers
Montpellier HSC managers
Ligue 1 managers
Ligue 2 managers
Footballers from Occitania (administrative region)